Cityhopper may refer to:

CityHopper, ferry service in Brisbane, Australia
KLM Cityhopper, Dutch airline